The 9th Kanonloppet was a motor race, run to Formula One rules, held on 11 August 1963 at the Karlskoga Circuit, Sweden. The race was run over two heats of 20 laps of the little circuit, and was won by British driver Jim Clark in a Lotus 25.

The first heat was won easily by Clark, with team-mate Trevor Taylor in a comfortable second place, from Jack Brabham in third. All the other runners were lapped at least once. Brabham had led for most of the race but suffered fuel shortage problems and his engine cut out. The second heat saw a reverse of the first, with Brabham winning from Taylor and Clark, with just a few tenths of a second separating the two Lotus drivers.

The only two retirements were the two BKL Lotus cars in the second heat. This race marked the Formula One debuts of the 1967 World Champion Denny Hulme, and British driver David Prophet.

Results

Fastest lap: (Heat 1) Jim Clark 1:30.6
Fastest lap: (Heat 2) Jack Brabham 1:36.1

References

 "The Grand Prix Who's Who", Steve Small, 1995.

Kanonloppet
Kanonloppet